Elizabeth Morgan is a British actress and writer. She has acted primarily in supporting roles, in films, television, and onstage.

Biography
She was born as Elizabeth Morgan in Llanelli, Wales. She appeared in the 1979 Emmy Award-winning BBC drama On Giant's Shoulders, which told the story of thalidomide victim Terry Wiles. 

She was perhaps most known for providing the voices of Destiny and Rhapsody Angels in Captain Scarlet and the Mysterons. She has been a long-time member of the BBC Drama Repertory Company London. In 1993 she played the female lead in Ian Sachs' promotional film Lenny Goes to the Country for the Royal Mail.

Morgan has written a large number of radio plays, and has also published novels and collections of short stories.

References

External links

Welsh film actresses
Welsh stage actresses
Welsh television actresses
Year of birth missing (living people)
Living people
Place of birth missing (living people)